The 2010 Auckland local elections took place from 17 September until 9 October and were conducted by postal vote. The elections were the first since the merger of the seven councils and elected the new Auckland Council, composed of the mayor and 20 councillors, and 149 members of 21 local boards. It also elected 21 district health board members and 41 licensing trust members.

Mayoral election

At the close of nominations at 12 noon of 20 August 2010, the following candidates had been nominated for mayor:

Governing body elections
20 members were elected to governing body of the Auckland Council across thirteen wards using first-past-the-post.

Rodney (1)

Albany (2)

North Shore (2)

Waitakere (2)

Whau (1)

Albert-Eden-Roskill (2)

Waitemata and Gulf (1)

Ōrākei (1)

Maungakiekie-Tamaki (1)

Howick (2)

The ward was originally going to be called Te Irirangi, but this was changed after strong local opposition.

Manukau (2)

Manurewa-Papakura (2)

Franklin (1)

Licensing Trust elections
In the 2010 Auckland licensing trust elections, forty-one members were elected to six licensing trusts across Auckland.

Birkenhead Licensing Trust (6)

Mt Wellington Licensing Trust (6)

Parakai Licensing Trust (6)

Portage Licensing Trust

No.1 (Auckland City) Ward (3)

No.2 (New Lynn) Ward (2)

No.3 (Glen Eden) Ward (2)

No.4 (Titirangi-Green Bay) Ward (2)

No.5 (Kelston West) Ward (1)

Wiri Licensing Trust (6)

Waitakere Licensing Trust

No.1 (Te Atatū) (2)

No.2 (Lincoln) (3)

No.3 (Waitakere) (1)

No.4 (Henderson) (1)

See also
2013 Auckland local elections
2010 New Zealand local elections

References

External links
Official 2010 Local Elections website
Auckland Transitional Authority
Local Government Commission
Auckland Regional Council 2010 elections
Rodney District Council 2010 elections
North Shore City Council elections
Waitakere City Council 2010 elections
Auckland City Council 2010 elections
Manukau City Council elections
Franklin District Council elections

Local elections in New Zealand
2010 elections in New Zealand
Local elections 2010
2010s in Auckland
September 2010 events in New Zealand
October 2010 events in New Zealand